Odostomia pocahontasae is a species of sea snail, a marine gastropod mollusc in the family Pyramidellidae, the pyrams and their allies.

Description
The length of the shell varies between 1.3 mm and 5.7 mm.

Distribution
This marine species occurs off Florida, USA,  Colombia and Argentina

References

External links
 To ITIS
 To World Register of Marine Species
 

pocahontasae
Gastropods described in 1914